Virginia Township is an inactive township in Pemiscot County, in the U.S. state of Missouri.

It is unclear why the name Virginia was applied to this township.

References

Townships in Missouri
Townships in Pemiscot County, Missouri